The Pacific Reporter, Pacific Reporter Second, and Pacific Reporter Third are United States regional case law reporters.  It is part of the National Reporter System created by John B. West for West Publishing Company, which is now part of Thomson West.

The Pacific Reporter contains published appellate court case decisions for:
 Alaska
 Arizona
 California
 Colorado
 Hawaii
 Idaho
 Kansas
 Montana
 Nevada
 New Mexico
 Oklahoma
 Oregon
 Utah
 Washington
 Wyoming

When cited, the Pacific Reporter, Pacific Reporter Second, and Pacific Reporter Third are abbreviated "P.", "P.2d", and "P.3d", respectively.

Date ranges 
The first Pacific Reporter series only had 300 volumes, and spanned from January 1883 to June 1931 (1 P. 1 to 300 P. 1119). The second series, with 999 volumes, covered June 1931 to March 2000 (1 P.2d 1 to 999 P.2d 1310). The third series began in May 2000 with 1 P.3d 1.

References

External links
 

National Reporter System